Eufidonia is a genus of moths in the family Geometridae first described by Packard in 1876.

Species
 Eufidonia convergaria (Walker, 1860)
 Eufidonia discospilata (Walker, 1862)
 Eufidonia notataria (Walker, 1860)

References

"Eufidonia Packard 1876". Encyclopedia of Life.

Melanolophiini